Gábor Herbert (born 6 February 1979 in Komló) is a Hungarian handballer who plays for Csurgói KK and the Hungarian national team.

Achievements
Nemzeti Bajnokság I:
Winner: 2007
Runner-up: 2006, 2008, 2009, 2010, 2011
Magyar Kupa:
Winner: 2006, 2008
Runner-up: 2009, 2010

References

External links
 Gábor Herbert profile at Csurgói KK official website
 Gábor Herbert career statistics at Worldhandball

1979 births
Living people
Hungarian male handball players
People from Komló
Sportspeople from Baranya County